The Boat Is Full is a 1981 German-language Swiss film directed by Markus Imhoof. The film was nominated for the Academy Award for Best Foreign Language Film as a Swiss submission. It was also entered into the 31st Berlin International Film Festival, where it won the Silver Bear for an outstanding single achievement.

Cast
 Tina Engel - Judith Krueger
 Hans Diehl - Hannes Krueger
 Martin Walz - Olaf Landau
 Curt Bois - Lazar Ostrowskij
 Ilse Bahrs - Frau Ostrowskij
 Gerd David - Karl Schneider
 Renate Steiger - Anna Flueckiger
 Mathias Gnädinger - Franz Flueckiger
 Michael Gempart - Landjäger Bigler
 Klaus Steiger - Reverend Hochdorfer
 Alice Bruengger - Frau Hochdorfer
 Otto Dornbierer - Otti
 Monika Koch - Rosemarie
 Ernst Stiefel - Dr, Baertschi
 Johannes Peyer - Truck Driver
 Gertrud Demenga - Peasant Woman

Title
The title of the film derives from what was expressed by the Swiss during World War II, for as a nonbelligerent country many refugees desired entry there, with most being denied permission.  They were frequently told, "Our boat is full," a reference to passengers of a lifeboat after a ship sinking frequently refusing to allow any further survivors to enter their craft after it had reached a level of occupancy felt to approach the limit of safety.

See also
 List of submissions to the 54th Academy Awards for Best Foreign Language Film
 List of Swiss submissions for the Academy Award for Best Foreign Language Film
 Grüningers Fall, a 1997 Swiss documentary film
 Akte Grüninger, a 2013 Swiss-Austrian film

References

Further reading
 Hacken, Richard (2008). "Book Review: The Boat is Full: Swiss Asylum Denied," Swiss American Historical Society Review, vol.44 (2008), no. 3, pp. 26-29.

External links

1981 films
Swiss drama films
Swiss German-language films
1981 drama films
Films directed by Markus Imhoof
Films about immigration

Holocaust films
Films about deserters
1980s German-language films